Haymarket railway station is the second largest railway station in Edinburgh, Scotland, after Waverley railway station.

The station serves as a major commuter and long-distance destination, located near the city centre, in the West End. Trains from the station serve much of Scotland, including Fife and Glasgow, as well as suburban lines to the east, and the East Coast Main Line through to London King's Cross. It is the seventh busiest railway station in Scotland.

History
During 1842, Haymarket railway station was opened as the original terminus of the Edinburgh and Glasgow Railway. The station represented the launch of a new age of travelling opportunities to the Scottish capital, being the first intercity route to be built and offering a previously unheard of journey time of two and a half hours between Scotland's two largest cities. Reportedly, early passenger numbers were far in excess of any expectations held during the line's construction, having topped one million by 1846. Due to backlash from the Church of Scotland, the early practice of running Sunday trains was suspended.

The station building itself featured impressive Doric-style porticos and was often hailed for its impressive architecture and engineering. It served not only a major transport hub for the city, but also as the headquarters of the Edinburgh and Glasgow Railway company itself. During 1846, the line was extended through the Haymarket tunnels and Princes Street Gardens to what is today known as Edinburgh Waverley railway station; other railway stations, which had the benefit of being more centrally sited, were also springing up around the city and some came to overshadow Haymarket Station. Its name has always been just Haymarket, as opposed to Edinburgh Haymarket — although the latter designation has been used in timetables by some train operating companies for the purpose of clarity.

By the 1890s, Haymarket had lost some of its original appeal, and came to be often subject to criticism over a lack of maintenance and a perpetual climate of austerity. During 1894, covered platforms were added to the station by the railway engineer James Carswell. Reportedly, during the 1960s and 1970s, British Rail studied options for several new station buildings and other renovations, but ultimately did not want to invest in Haymarket in case it was soon closed.

During 1983, British Rail performed some alterations to the station; Haymarket's original train shed was demolished and moved to  Bo'ness, while its footbridge was replaced by a smaller counterpart and new platform canopies were installed. As a result of these renovations, the station broke new ground as the first purpose-built barrierless station. In 1989, the south tunnel was electrified by British Rail, while Platform 4 was also extended, as part of the East Coast Main Line electrification programme to allow for through electric trains from King's Cross in London to Glasgow Central and from Waverley station towards the West Coast Main Line. During 2011, in conjunction with the Airdrie to Bathgate project, the north tunnel was also electrified.

Since December 2006, the station features four through platforms along with a single bay platform sited on the north side of the station. As a general operating rule, trains to and from stations across the Forth Bridge tend to use Platforms 1 and 2, while those trains running to and from Glasgow and the West Coast Main Line make use of Platforms 3 and 4. The bay platform, which is presently designated as Platform 0, was built for services that terminated at Haymarket, which has often occurred when major engineering works take place at the larger Waverley station. All of the station's platforms are now electrified.

Between 1997 and 2012, the annual number of passengers that were recorded as having used the facility had risen by a massive 138 per cent; by 2012, in excess of two million passengers using the station during each year. According to some projections, passenger numbers at Haymarket are expected to climb to as high as 10 million by 2030.

The station has been listed as being amongst the most congested on the Scottish railway network, which has been attributed to repeated rapid increases in commuters using it and aggravated by a lack of modernisation for some time. According to industry publication Rail Engineer, by 2012, Haymarket possessed one of the oldest station buildings and ticket offices in the whole of the United Kingdom; the old facility was small and the 1980s-era footbridge was relatively narrow, factors which did not lend themselves to a huge expansion in passenger footfall. In part to address this growth, during the 2000s and 2010s, state-owned rail owner and maintainer Network Rail performed a £24 million upgrade programme at Haymarket Station, as had been announced during its 2007 business plan; this work was focused on the remodelling of its passenger facilities to better serve growing demand.

The installation of passenger lifts to enable all platforms to be fully accessible to those with reduced mobility, in accordance with the Disability Discrimination Act, was one major change enacted during 2011. However, perhaps the most extensive modification programme to be made at Haymarket Station to date, which involved the development of a new concourse and various other improvements to improve the station's capacity, were performed as a part of the wider Edinburgh to Glasgow Improvement Programme (EGIP), which sought to improve all rail-related matters between the two largest cities in Scotland.

Redevelopment 
Under EGIP, £25 million was allocated for the redevelopment of Haymarket Station. The station's new design was developed by a multi- discipline team, headed by the Halcrow Group, the work's lead consultant; IDP Architects designed much of the programme's architectural aspects, while SVM Glasgow provided mechanical and electrical engineering support. Factors which had to be taken into account included the booking office's category A listed building, its prominent location in the city, and newly developed tram network Edinburgh Trams that was to be incorporated in the station's role as a transport hub. During December 2011, construction company Morgan Sindall were awarded the £25 million 'target cost' contract to construct the new station.

The design produced centered around the construction of brand new station building, the interior of which accommodates ten times the amount of public space for passengers as its predecessor. The redeveloped station also features a new main entrance, in addition to the retention of its earlier entryway, which also provides for direct pedestrian access to the new tram route passing through Haymarket Terrace. The new building is connected to all of the station's platforms via a newly built, wider footbridge, which was provisioned with both lifts and escalators, along with special event stairs to facilitate excellent access to the nearby Murrayfield Stadium. In addition, various retail outlets were established in the new building; approximately 15 per cent of the new concourse is allocated to retail space.

More minor changes that were incorporated into the design include the installation of energy-saving lighting and modern passenger information systems, while the platforms were resurfaced and the installation of longer canopies, which is aimed at providing better protection from bad weather conditions and increase boarding speeds. One particularly unusual feature adopted was the ETFE Air Filled Pillow roof, which uses pillows of transparent ethylene tetrafluoroethylene (ETFE) material filled with dehumidified air which is cycled via a central air pump; it offers a reduced weight while also being an intentionally sacrificial element of the structure in the event of an accident or major incident. Some design changes had to be incorporated before planning permission would be granted; in one case, the proposed copper cladding had to be replaced by a black granite and zinc counterpart.

During May 2012, construction work commenced at the station, initially focused upon temporary station alterations to create space for the new concourse and the undercroft below it. Where possible, items were partially built off-site before being transported and moved into position using large cranes, such as the steelwork for the new footbridge, which minimised passenger impact and was considered to be more safe. According to Network Rail's project manager Tom McPake, work typically involved no disruption to train services as it only required rules of the route possessions; keeping the station operational throughout was described as being the main challenge. Reportedly, the redevelopment scheme had been completed both on time and within the assigned budget. During December 2013, the Minister for Transport and the Islands Keith Brown formally reopened the station, marking the official completion of work. Cleanup work, such as the demolition of the old footbridge and lifts, continued until April 2014.

1924 accident
On 28 July 1924, a passenger train ignored a stop signal and collided with a second train at the station. Five people were killed. According to the report written by Colonel J. W. Pringle for the Ministry of Transport, the accident was a SPAD (Signal Passed at Danger) caused by the position of the driver, his misreading of the signal, and his not being able to hear the warning bell owing to the noise of the engine.

Transport interchange

The railway station is served by Edinburgh Trams service, which began operating in May 2014. Renovations to the station, in compliance with the Edinburgh to Glasgow Improvement Programme, have turned it into an intermodal transport interchange, whereby it is simple to connect between the trams, bus services (including Lothian Buses, McGill's Scotland East and Scottish Citylink) and taxi services. The 900 Edinburgh–Glasgow bus service calls here.

Services

Platforms and layout 
Haymarket has a total of 5 platforms, numbered 0 to 4. Platforms 1 and 2 are used for trains to/from stations across the River Forth (accessed via the Forth Rail bridge). Platforms 3 and 4 are used for trains to Glasgow as well as all West Coast Main Line Services.

References

External links

Railway stations in Edinburgh
Former North British Railway stations
Railway stations in Great Britain opened in 1842
Railway stations served by ScotRail
Railway stations served by CrossCountry
Railway stations served by TransPennine Express
Railway stations served by Avanti West Coast
Railway stations served by London North Eastern Railway
Edinburgh Trams stops
Category A listed buildings in Edinburgh
Listed railway stations in Scotland
Stations on the West Coast Main Line